Leon Abravanel (born July 8, 1986, South Lake Tahoe, California) is an American soccer coach, entrepreneur & teacher.

Soccer career

Youth and amateur soccer
Abravanel attended South Tahoe High School, captaining the team to a state championship in his senior year (Ranked 14th in the Nation), played club soccer for the US National Champion San Juan Predators, and was a four-year member of the Region IV Olympic Development Program team.  He was also a High School All-American & High School Academic All-American.  He then went on to play college soccer at the University of San Diego where he earned a full-rise scholarship. After red-shirting his junior year, he transferred to the University of Denver where he led his program to its first ever NCAA D1 playoff berth while receiving a full-ride scholarship.

Undrafted by the MLS out of college, Abravanel subsequently played with the Kitsap Pumas in the USL Premier Development League.

Professional soccer
Abravanel turned professional when he signed with the expansion Los Angeles Blues of the new USL Professional League in February 2010. He made his professional debut on April 17, 2011 in a 2-1 victory over Antigua Barracuda He also trained & played with Athletico Paranese (Brazilian 1st Division), La Paz Futbol Club (Bolivian 1st Division), & FC Osnabrück (German 3rd Division).  His professional soccer career lasted four-year and he retired at 25 years old.

References

External links
 Official site
 Denver bio
 San Diego bio

1986 births
Living people
Soccer players from California
San Diego Toreros men's soccer players
Denver Pioneers men's soccer players
Kitsap Pumas players
Orange County SC players
OC Pateadores Blues players
USL League Two players
USL Championship players
People from South Lake Tahoe, California
Association football defenders
American men's soccer players